Trevor Babajack Steger (born 21 April 1963) is a British blues musician. He is best known for his work with his former band Babajack, and his subsequent solo career. To date, Steger has released three solo albums and been nominated for numerous British Blues Awards. 

Since the release of his third solo album Not Far To Go, Steger has been joined regularly at live shows by percussionist Jesse Benns and violinist Jo Chambers, known as the Trevor Babajack Trio.

Biography
Trevor Babajack Steger was born in Cheltenham, Gloucestershire, England, and raised listening to his mother, a club singer. He has stated there were only two records in his parents record collection, Johnny Cash and Rory Gallagher.In the late seventies he began his musical career by playing bass in a punk band.

In 1981, a friend dragged him reluctantly along to see Nine Below Zero, the day after he bought himself a Sonny Boy Williamson II record and a harmonica.

Living and working in the 1990s with the Shona people in Mashonaland East Province, Zimbabwe, Steger's first son, Jack was born. Shona custom is that the father takes his son's name, so Steger  became known as 'Babajack' (the Father of Jack).

His music is influenced by his acquired passion for early rural Blues, mixed with the sounds of rhythmic African roots, in what can only be described as his own genre of original and seemingly improvised music. His travels have taken him the length of the UK and across Europe, headlining blues and roots festivals and from little French cafés to The Royal Albert Hall. 

After the success and eventual disbanding of Babajack, his first solo album Sawdust Man received critical acclaim with international radio play and being playlisted by BBC Radio 2.

This solo album was followed up by his second, The Solemn Truth and Barefaced Lies, which was nominated for the Blues and Roots Radio Best Album.

In 2022, Steger released his third solo album Not Far To Go, and in doing so recruited Jesse Benns on percussion and Jo Chambers on violin, forming the Trevor Babajack Trio. This album was picked as Album of the Month in December 2022 by the Independent Blues Broadcasters Association and also reached number 2 in the British Blues Chart. 

Steger can be found regularly touring either as a duo with Jesse Benns or a trio with Jo Chambers, as well as continuing to play solo shows.

Personal life
Steger lives on a narrow boat with his wife Emma in Gloucestershire.​ He is also an accomplished woodworker and has hand made several of his guitars that he uses at his live shows.

Discography

Solo
 Sawdust Man (2018)
 The Solemn Truth and Barefaced Lies (2020)
 Not Far To Go (2022)

With Babajack
 The Maker (2009)
 Rooster (2012)
 Running Man (2013)

References

External links
  – official site

1963 births
20th-century English male singers
21st-century English male singers
English blues guitarists
English blues singers
English country guitarists
English country singers
English male guitarists
English rock guitarists
English rock singers
Harmonica blues musicians
Living people
Musicians from Gloucestershire
Slide guitarists